Pseudestoloides affinis is a species of beetle in the family Cerambycidae. It was described by Martins and Galileo in 2009. It is known from Costa Rica.

References

Desmiphorini
Beetles described in 2009